The Hermiston Herald is a weekly paper published in Hermiston, Oregon, United States, since 1906. The Herald was founded by Horace Greeley Newport and William Skinner. It is published on Wednesdays by EO Media Group (formerly known as the East Oregonian Publishing Company) and has a circulation of 2,039. The paper was formerly owned by Western Communications.

G. M. "Jerry" Reed, an owner and publisher of the Herald from 1970 to 1991, was posthumously inducted into the Oregon Newspaper Publishers Association's hall of fame in 2017.

References

External links
The Hermiston Herald (official website)

Hermiston, Oregon
1906 establishments in Oregon
Newspapers published in Oregon
Oregon Newspaper Publishers Association
Publications established in 1906